Savvas Michael (Greek: Σάββας Μιχαήλ; born February 17, 1999) is a Cypriot Muay Thai fighter. He is the current WBC Muaythai World Lightweight champion.

Muay thai career
Michael made his professional debut against Abed Halaby in November 2013. He won the fight by a third-round knockout. He won his next four fights, before challenging Panagiotis Zissimopoulos for the WKU European title. Michael won the title by knockout. Michael would go on to win 20 of his next 21 fights, during which he won the ISKA European Lightweight Muay thai and WMC World Lightweight titles.

While his previous fights were mostly in the Greek muay thai circuit, after winning the WMC title, Michael began fighting almost exclusively in Thailand. He scored decision wins against Phetsongkom Sitjaroensub and Kaensuan Sasiprapa, as well as a KO win against Jomrachan Kiatworatha in the Rangsit Stadium. Michael participated in the 2018 Toyota Revo Marathon 135 lbs Tournament. He defeated Kongsuiya Sitnatee by decision in the quarterfinals, and Vladimir Lytkin by head kick in the finals, before facing Felipe Lobo in the finals. He beat Lobo by decision.

Michael entered the 2018 Toyota Revo Marathon 140 lbs Tournament as well. He beat Antonio Faria by decision in the semifinals, and Julio Lobo by decision in the finals.

He made his ONE Championship debut against Singtongnoi Por.Telakun at ONE Championship: Warriors Of Light, winning the fight by unanimous decision. He next knocked out Petngam Kiatkampon at the Rajadamnern Stadium, before returning to ONE to face Lerdsila Chumpairtour at ONE Championship: Dreams of Gold. Lerdsila won the fight by a second-round TKO.

In December 2019, Michael fought Dennanpho Sor Thanyaluk for the WBC Muaythai World Lightweight title. Savvas won the fight by a fourth-round TKO.

After his title win, Michael returned to ONE at ONE Championship: Warrior’s Code against Taiki Naito. Naito won the fight by unanimous decision.

Michael faced the former Omnoi stadium champion Amir Naseri at ONE 157 on May 20, 2022 in the ONE Muay Thai Flyweight Grand Prix Quarter Final. He won the fight by unanimous decision.

Michael faced Panpayak Jitmuangnon in the quarterfinals of the ONE Muay Thai Flyweight Grand Prix at ONE on Prime Video 1 on August 27, 2022. He lost after getting knocked out with a head kick in the second round.

Due to a disagreement between his gym, Petchyindee Academy, and ONE Championship, all Petchyindee fighters were released from the promotion at the request of the gym.

Championships and awards

Amateur
 Cyprus Muaythai Federation
 8x Cyprus National Muay Thai Champion
 World Muaythai Federation (WMF) 
 2012 WMF Junior World Champion
 2013 WMF Junior World Champion
 2014 WMF Junior World Champion
 2014 WMF Pan-European Games Champion
 2014 WMF Junior European -60 kg Champion
 2015 WMF Junior European Champion
 2016 WMF Youth World -60 kg Champion
 International Sport Karate Association (ISKA) 
 2015 ISKA K-1 European Champion

Professional
 World Kickboxing and Karate Union (WKU)
 2014 WKU Europe Champion
 International Sport Karate Association (ISKA) 
 2016 ISKA Muay Thai European -60 kg Champion
 World Muaythai Council (WMC)  
 2017 WMC World 135 lbs Champion
 Toyota Marathon  
 2018 Toyota Hilux Revo Marathon 135 lbs Champion
 2018 Toyota Hilux Revo Marathon 140 lbs Champion
 World Boxing Council Muaythai
 2019 WBC Muay Thai World Lightweight Champion

Muay Thai record

|-  style="background:#fbb;"
| 2022-12-02|| Loss ||align=left| Duangsompong Jitmuangnon || Rajadamnern World Series + Petchyindee, Rajadamnern Stadium || Bangkok, Thailand || Decision (Unanimous) || 3 || 3:00 
|-  style="background:#fbb;"
| 2022-11-03|| Loss ||align=left| Joseph Jitmuangnon || Petchyindee, Rajadamnern Stadium || Bangkok, Thailand || Decision || 5 || 3:00
|-  style="background:#fbb;"
| 2022-08-27|| Loss ||align=left| Panpayak Jitmuangnon ||  ONE on Prime Video 1 || Kallang, Singapore || KO (Head kick) || 2 || 0:15
|-
! style=background:white colspan=9 |
|-  style="background:#cfc;"
| 2022-05-20|| Win ||align=left| Amir Naseri ||  ONE 157  || Kallang, Singapore || Decision (Unanimous) || 3 || 3:00 
|-
! style=background:white colspan=9 |
|-  style="background:#cfc;"
| 2021-10-24|| Win ||align=left| Oscar Crespo || SuperShowDown || Bolton, England || TKO (Body punches)|| 2 || 
|-  style="background:#fbb;"
| 2020-02-07|| Loss ||align=left| Taiki Naito ||  ONE Championship: Warrior’s Code || Jakarta, Indonesia || Decision (Unanimous)  || 3 || 3:00
|-  style="background:#cfc;"
| 2019-12-27|| Win ||align=left| Dennanpho Sor Thanyaluk || Lumpinee Stadium || Bangkok, Thailand || TKO (Referee Stoppage)|| 4 || 1:43
|-
! style=background:white colspan=9 |
|-  style="background:#FFBBBB;"
| 2019-08-16|| Loss||align=left| Lerdsila Chumpairtour|| |ONE Championship: Dreams of Gold || Bangkok, Thailand || TKO (Arm Injury/Thrown) || 2 || 0:40
|-  style="background:#cfc;"
| 2019-07-11|| Win ||align=left| Petngam Kiatkampon || Rajadamnern Stadium || Bangkok, Thailand || KO (Left Knee to the body)|| 2 ||
|-  style="background:#cfc;"
| 2019-05-10|| Win ||align=left| Singtongnoi Por.Telakun || ONE Championship: Warriors Of Light || Bangkok, Thailand || Decision (Unanimous) || 3 || 3:00
|-  style="background:#cfc;"
| 2019-03-21|| Win ||align=left| Tawansuk SitAor.Boonshop || Rajadamnern Stadium || Bangkok, Thailand || KO (Front kick) || 3 ||
|-  style="background:#cfc;"
| 2019-02-21|| Win ||align=left| Petchsongphak Sitjaroensap || Rajadamnern Stadium || Bangkok, Thailand || KO (Punches)|| 3 ||
|-  style="background:#FFBBBB;"
| 2019-01-17|| Loss ||align=left| Petchsongphak Sitjaroensap || Rajadamnern Stadium || Bangkok, Thailand || Decision || 5 || 3:00
|-  style="background:#cfc;"
| 2018-12-21|| Win ||align=left| Julio Lobo || Toyota Revo Marathon Tournament, Final || Bangkok, Thailand || Decision || 5 || 3:00
|-
! style=background:white colspan=9 |
|-  style="background:#cfc;"
| 2018-12-21|| Win ||align=left| Antonio Faria || Toyota Marathon Tournament, Semi Final || Bangkok, Thailand || Decision || 5 || 3:00
|-  style="background:#cfc;"
| 2018-10-18|| Win ||align=left| Raksommai Sor.Sommai || Rajadamnern Stadium || Bangkok, Thailand || KO (Straight to the body)|| 3 ||
|-  style="background:#cfc;"
| 2018-09-28|| Win ||align=left| Sornphet SamartPayakaroonGym || Petchyindee + True4u, Rangsit Stadium || Rangsit, Thailand || Decision || 5 || 3:00
|-  style="background:#cfc;"
| 2018-05-18|| Win ||align=left| Felipe Lobo || Toyota Revo Marathon Tournament, Final || Thailand || Decision || 3 || 3:00
|-
! style=background:white colspan=9 |
|-  style="background:#cfc;"
| 2018-05-18|| Win ||align=left| Vladimir Lytkin || Toyota Revo Marathon Tournament, Semi Final|| Thailand || TKO (High kick) || 1 ||
|-  style="background:#cfc;"
| 2018-05-18|| Win ||align=left| Kongsuiya Sitnatee || Toyota Revo Marathon Tournament, Quarter Finals || Thailand || Decision || 3 || 3:00
|-  style="background:#cfc;"
| 2018-03-17|| Win ||align=left| Kaensuan Sasiprapa || Topking World Series || Thailand || Decision || 3 || 3:00
|-  style="background:#cfc;"
| 2018-02-23|| Win||align=left| Jomrachan Kiatworatha || Petchyindee + True4u, Rangsit Stadium || Rangsit, Thailand || KO (Punches) || 4 || 2:00
|-  style="background:#cfc;"
| 2017-12-08|| Win||align=left| Phetsongkom Sitjaroensap || Petchyindee + True4u, Rangsit Stadium || Rangsit, Thailand || Decision || 5 || 3:00
|-  style="background:#cfc;"
| 2017-09-29|| Win||align=left| Alexander Kernnanski || Petchyindee + True4u, Rangsit Stadium || Rangsit, Thailand || TKO (Referee Stoppage) || 2 || 
|-
! style=background:white colspan=9 |
|-  style="background:#cfc;"
| 2017-09-08|| Win||align=left| Kaiwantae Kiatchatchai  || Petchyindee + True4u, Rangsit Stadium || Rangsit, Thailand || TKO (Knee and elbows)|| 4  ||
|-  style="background:#cfc;"
| 2017-06-25|| Win||align=left| Yuri Gentile || The Rising Stars || Cyprus || KO || 3 ||
|-  style="background:#cfc;"
| 2017-05-19|| Win||align=left| Suanluang TBM Gym || Lumpinee Stadium || Bangkok, Thailand || Decision || 5 || 3:00
|-  style="background:#FFBBBB;"
| 2017-04-28|| Loss||align=left| Phetsongkom Sitjaroensap || Toyota Revo Marathon Tournament, Semi Final || Thailand || Decision || 3 || 3:00
|-  style="background:#cfc;"
| 2017-04-28|| Win||align=left| Kundiew Payapkumpan || Toyota Revo Marathon Tournament, Quarter Finals || Thailand || KO (Left knee to the body) || 2 ||
|-  style="background:#cfc;"
| 2017-02-12|| Win||align=left| Jonno Chipchase || Tanko Muay Thai League || Manchester, England || KO (Body punches)|| 5 ||
|-  style="background:#cfc;"
| 2017-01-28|| Win||align=left| Lukasz Leczycki || KOK 43 World Championship 2017 In Nikosia || Nicosia, Cyprus || Decision || 3 ||  3:00
|-  style="background:#cfc;"
| 2016-12-04|| Win||align=left| Stefan Sirbu || Cyprus Fighting Championship 2 || Cyprus || ||  ||
|-  style="background:#cfc;"
| 2016-09-30|| Win||align=left| Serkan Rustemoglu || Prestige Fights 2 || Cyprus || Decision || 5 || 2:00 
|-
! style=background:white colspan=9 |
|-  style="background:#cfc;"
| 2016-08|| Win||align=left|  || True4u Channel 11 Stadium || Bangkok, Thailand || ||  ||
|-  style="background:#cfc;"
| 2016-08-14|| Win||align=left| Numchai Huaiyaikombat || Max Muay Thai|| Pattaya, Thailand || KO || 2 ||
|-  style="background:#cfc;"
| 2016-07-02|| Win||align=left| Alexandros Maragkakis || The Castle Gladiators 2 || Cyprus ||  ||  ||
|-  style="background:#cfc;"
| 2016-04-23|| Win||align=left| Tagir Khalilov || Prestige Fights || Cyprus ||  ||  || 
|-
! style=background:white colspan=9 |
|-  style="background:#cfc;"
| 2016-03-01|| Win||align=left| Saif El Dine Zaqzouq || Beirut Fight Night || Lebanon ||  ||  ||
|-  style="background:#cfc;"
| 2016-01-23|| Win||align=left| Christos Kesaris || Adrenaline Muay Thai Battling || Cyprus || TKO (Doctor Stoppage) || 4 ||
|-  style="background:#cfc;"
| 2015-08-26|| Win||align=left|  || Lumpinee Stadium || Bangkok, Thailand || KO (Left Knee to the body) || 2 ||
|-  style="background:#cfc;"
| 2015-07-26|| Win||align=left| || International Top Fight Muay Thai || Cyprus ||  ||  ||
|-  style="background:#cfc;"
| 2015-07-11|| Win||align=left| Ioannis Tzakakos || Gladiator || Cyprus || ||  ||
|-  style="background:#cfc;"
| 2015-06-27|| Win||align=left| Antonios Stroutzalis || K1MBO || Cyprus || ||  ||
|-  style="background:#cfc;"
| 2015-06-07|| Win||align=left| Giannis Katsakos || Made for War || Cyprus || ||  ||
|-  style="background:#cfc;"
| 2015-05-09|| Win||align=left|  ||  || Cyprus || ||  ||
|-  style="background:#cfc;"
| 2014-12-21|| Win||align=left| Panagiotis Zissimopoulos || The Ultimate Action Show || Cyprus || KO (Knee to the body) ||  || 
|-
! style=background:white colspan=9 |
|-  style="background:#cfc;"
| 2014-08-02|| Win||align=left|  ||  || Cyprus || ||  ||
|-  style="background:#cfc;"
| 2014-07-26|| Win||align=left|  ||  || Cyprus || ||  ||
|-  style="background:#cfc;"
| 2014-04-13|| Win||align=left| Petros Papoutsakis || Young Emperors || Cyprus || Decision || 3 || 3:00
|-  style="background:#cfc;"
| 2014-02-02|| Win||align=left| Petros Papoutsakis || Clash of Titans || Cyprus || Decision || 3 || 3:00
|-  style="background:#cfc;"
| 2013-11-10|| Win||align=left| Abed Halaby || Cyprus International Martial Arts Show || Cyprus || KO (elbow) ||  || 
|-
! style=background:white colspan=9 |
|-
| colspan=9 | Legend:    

|-  style="background:#cfc;"
| 2016-03|| Win||align=left| Sherov Kholmirzaev || WMF World Championship 2016, Final || Bangkok, Thailand ||  ||  || 
|-
! style=background:white colspan=9 |
|-  style="background:#cfc;"
| 2016-03|| Win||align=left| Victor Decarvalo || WMF World Championship 2016, Semi Final || Bangkok, Thailand ||  ||  ||
|-  style="background:#cfc;"
| 2016-03|| Win||align=left| Albert Arutiunian || WMF World Championship 2016, Quarter Final || Bangkok, Thailand ||  ||  ||
|-  style="background:#cfc;"
| 2014-09|| Win||align=left| Andreas Koualis || WMF European Championship 2014, Final || Bucharest, Romania ||  ||  || 
|-
! style=background:white colspan=9 |
|-  style="background:#cfc;"
| 2014-09|| Win||align=left| Adam Brahim || WMF World European 2014, Semi Final || Bucharest, Romania || Decision || 3 || 3:00
|-  style="background:#cfc;"
| 2014-09|| Win||align=left|  || WMF European Championship 2014, Quarter Final || Bucharest, Romania || KO (Elbow) || 2 ||
|-  style="background:#cfc;"
| 2014-03|| Win||align=left| Serdal Arpaci || WMF World Championship 2014, Final || Pattaya, Thailand || TKO (Doctor Stoppage/Elbow) ||  || 
|-
! style=background:white colspan=9 |
|-  style="background:#cfc;"
| 2014-03|| Win||align=left|  || WMF World Championship 2014, Semi Final || Pattaya, Thailand ||  ||  ||
|-  style="background:#cfc;"
| 2014-03|| Win||align=left|  || WMF World Championship 2014, Quarter Final || Pattaya, Thailand ||  ||  ||
|-  style="background:#cfc;"
| 2013-|| Win||align=left| Giorgos Marousides || Mortal Combat 2 || Cyprus || Decision || 3 || 3:00
|-
| colspan=9 | Legend:

See also
List of male kickboxers
List of WBC Muaythai world champions

References 

1999 births
Living people
Sportspeople from Limassol
Cypriot Muay Thai practitioners
ONE Championship kickboxers